Pseudochromis cyanotaenia, the surge dottyback or blue-barred dottyback, is a species of ray-finned fish from the Western Pacific which is classified in the family Pseudochromidae. It occasionally makes its way into the aquarium trade. It grows to a length of 6 cm.

References

cyanotaenia
Taxa named by Pieter Bleeker
Fish described in 1857